is an interchange passenger railway station in located in the city of Fujisawa, Kanagawa, Japan, jointly operated by private railway companies Odakyu Electric Railway and Sagami Railway (Sōtetsu), and the public Yokohama City Transportation Bureau (subway service). It is 15.8 kilometers from the starting point of the Odakyū Enoshima Line at Sagami-Ōno Station and is a terminal station for both the Sagami Railway Izumino Line and the Yokohama Subway Blue Line.

The ticket gates of the three lines converge on one wide underground concourse.

Lines
Odakyu Electric Railway
Odakyū Enoshima Line - Rapid Express and Express trains stop at this station.
Sagami Railway
Izumino Line
Yokohama Municipal Subway
Blue Line (B01)

Station layout
The Odakyu Enoshima Line has two elevated opposed side platforms, connected to the station building by an underpass. The Sōtetsu and Yokohama Municipal Subway stations are both underground, and each have a single island platform.

Odakyu platforms

Sōtetsu platforms

Yokohama Municipal Subway platforms

History

Shōnandai Station was opened on November 7, 1966 as a station on the Odakyū Enoshima Line. The station was greatly expanded in 1999 with the addition of the Sagami Railway Izumino Line on March 10, and the Yokohama Subway Blue Line on August 29.

Passenger statistics
In fiscal 2019, the Odakyu station was used by an average of 92,076 passengers daily. During the same fiscal year, the Sotetsu station was used by an average of 28,697 passengers daily, and the Yokohama Municipal Subway by an average of 48,023 passengers daily,

The passenger figures for previous years are as shown below.

Surrounding area

Public facilities
 Shonandai culture center
 Akibadai cultural gymnasium
 Shonandai park
 Engyo park
 Fujisawa North police station
 Fujisawa North fire station

See also
List of railway stations in Japan

References

External links

 Shōnandai Station information (Odakyu) 
 Shōnandai Station information (Sōtetsu) 
 Shōnandai Station information (Yokohama Subway) 

Railway stations in Kanagawa Prefecture
Railway stations in Japan opened in 1966
Odakyū Enoshima Line
Sagami Railway Izumino Line
Blue Line (Yokohama)
Stations of Odakyu Electric Railway
Stations of Sagami Railway
Stations of Yokohama City Transportation Bureau
Railway stations in Fujisawa, Kanagawa